Guizhou is a town under the administration of Zigui County, Hubei, China. , it has one residential community and 11 villages under its administration.

Administrative divisions
One residential community:
 Guizhou

Eleven villages:
 Pengjiapo, Quyuanmiao, Xiangjiawan, Xiangxi, Xiangjiadian, Zhoujiawan, Guanzhuangping, Yanguan, Wangusi, Baiguoyuan, Jiajiadian

References 

Township-level divisions of Hubei
Zigui County